Gamberini is an Italian surname and may refer to:

Alessandro Gamberini (born 1981), Italian footballer
Bruno Gamberini, (1950-2011), Brazilian archbishop
Fabio Gamberini, Brazilian race-driver
Gioacchino Gamberini 19th-century Italian painter
 

Italian-language surnames